The Cayman Islands competed at the 2018 Commonwealth Games in the Gold Coast, Australia from April 4 to April 15, 2018. The Cayman Islands announced a team of 22 athletes. However, Jamal Walton did not compete. It was The Cayman Islands's 11th appearance at the Commonwealth Games.

Long jumper Carl Morgan was the country's flag bearer during the opening ceremony.

Competitors
The following is the list of number of competitors participating at the Games per sport/discipline.

Athletics

The Cayman Islands announced a team of 4 male athletes.

Men
Track & road events

Field events

Boxing

The Cayman Islands announced a team of 2 athletes (1 man, 1 woman) will compete at the 2018 Commonwealth Games.

Cycling

The Cayman Islands announced a team of 1 athlete (1 man) will compete at the 2018 Commonwealth Games.

Road
Men

Gymnastics

The Cayman Islands announced a team of 2 athletes (2 women) will compete at the 2018 Commonwealth Games.

Artistic

Women
Individual Qualification

Shooting

The Cayman Islands announced a team of 1 athlete (1 man) will compete at the 2018 Commonwealth Games.

Squash

The Cayman Islands announced a team of 7 athletes (3 men, 4 women) will compete at the 2018 Commonwealth Games.

Individual

Doubles

Swimming

The Cayman Islands announced a team of 4 athletes (2 men, 2 women) will compete at the 2018 Commonwealth Games.

Men

Women

See also
Cayman Islands at the 2018 Summer Youth Olympics

References

Nations at the 2018 Commonwealth Games
Cayman Islands at the Commonwealth Games
2018 in Caymanian sport